Juan Carlos Docabo (born 14 December 1970) is an Argentine footballer who played for San Lorenzo, Vélez Sársfield, Temuco, Perugia, Viterbese, Chacarita Juniors, Estudiantes and Banfield. He retired in 2006.

External links
 Juan Carlos Docabo at BDFA.com.ar 

1970 births
Living people
Footballers from Buenos Aires
Argentine footballers
San Lorenzo de Almagro footballers
Club Atlético Vélez Sarsfield footballers
A.C. Perugia Calcio players
U.S. Viterbese 1908 players
Chacarita Juniors footballers
Estudiantes de La Plata footballers
Deportes Temuco footballers
Club Atlético Banfield footballers
Argentine expatriate footballers
Expatriate footballers in Chile
Expatriate footballers in Italy
Argentine Primera División players
Serie A players
Serie B players
Argentine expatriate sportspeople in Italy
Association football goalkeepers